Yao Jiangshan (Chinese: 姚江山; pinyin: Yáo Jiāngshān; born 30 July 1987) is a Chinese footballer who currently plays as a midfielder for Qingdao Hainiu.

Club career
Yao started his professional football career in 2006 when he was promoted to Qingdao Jonoon's first squad. He made his senior debut on 11 March 2007, in a 2–0 victory against Liaoning FC. He quickly established himself with the first team and scored his first senior goal on 5 September 2007, in a 1–1 home draw with Inter Xi'an. He was linked with K League Classic side Daejeon Citizen in early 2013, however, he finally stayed at Qingdao for the 2013 league campaign.

On 3 January 2015, Yao transferred to fellow China League One side Hunan Billows. On 23 February 2017, Yao transferred to his hometown club Qingdao Huanghai. He would become an integral member of the team that would win the 2019 China League One division and promotion into the top tier.

Career statistics 
Statistics accurate as of match played 31 December 2020.

Honours

Club
Qingdao Huanghai
China League One: 2019

References

External links
 

1987 births
Living people
Association football midfielders
Chinese footballers
Footballers from Qingdao
Qingdao Hainiu F.C. (1990) players
Hunan Billows players
Qingdao F.C. players
Chinese Super League players
China League One players